From 1876 to 1913, the Polytechnic Society of Kentucky was an educational, cultural and scientific organization based in downtown Louisville, Kentucky, United States. The creation of the society was to serve as a funding source for the Public Library of Kentucky which had gone bankrupt. The society operated on Fourth Street, inside Library Hall, until 1901.

Overview 
A lottery that was meant to be a major funding source to start a library for the city of Louisville was a scam that placed a $30,000 debt on the organization. On January 11, 1879, the debt of the old library was paid by seven new members. In turn they asked to be in trusted with management for five years. Dr. Stuart Robinson, one of the new members, became the president of the society.   

Now that the society had been created from the ashes of the old Public Library of Kentucky, it had acquired all the assets that it once possessed. This included Library Hall, which featured an art gallery, museum, classrooms, lecture halls, two theaters and 60,000 books. The society was divided into five academies: literature, science, art, philosophy, and technology. The Polytechnic Society's new purpose was to help provide literary and scientific knowledge to the public while keeping the library free for all.

History 
The Polytechnic Society's primary founder was the librarian of the Public Library of Kentucky, Paul Allen Towne.  On April 30, 1875 Towne inherited the Library of Kentucky and all its assets from the Board of Trustees.

In February 1876, Towne hosted lectures to raise money for the library. By that summer, Professor Pepper of the Polytechnic Institute of London spoke for a series of lectures with his lantern slide projector, which at the time was high technology. Several other lectures were also held by scientists and artists of Louisville. These lectures brought in hundreds of people as well as financial assistance for the library.

In December 1876, Towne invited Louisville's leading citizens to help organize a new establishment. He purposed a way that could make it profitable to re-open the library by creating a society of science, literary and art for the public. A constitution was drafted based upon the Maitland Club of Scotland. The members of the society were divided into the five academies with their own presidents, vice-presidents and secretaries. The Polytechnic Society of Kentucky was named after a lantern slide projector bought from Professor Pepper. The project was in the room during the naming of the organization. 

In 1881, Bennett H. Young becomes president of the society.

Twice a month the society held sessions with subjects including philosophy, religion, science and politics. Its Academy of Art received the highest attendance. 40 art classes were organized, including drawing, painting, wood carving, medieval lettering, and decorative design. Classes on prehistoric, ancient and modern art were also held.

The Polytechnic Society reached its peak in the mid-1880s with 715 members.

In 1887, a section of the Polytechnic Society building was leased out to Kaufman-Straus department store, to increase revenues. In 1901 the society sold the grounds to Kaufman-Straus, and a new building was erected and opened in 1903. The Polytechnic Society continued to operate from the fourth floor until the new location on York Street was completed in 1905.

Col. Bennett H. Young becomes known as "the father of the Louisville Free Public Library."

In 1908, the new Louisville Free Public Library building opens to the public. 

By 1912 membership of the Polytechnic Society had decreased to 37. 

On January 9, 1913, the Polytechnic Society held its last meeting and relinquished its property to the Louisville Free Public Library.

Librarians 
 Paul Allen Towne, 1873–1878
 William L. Hickman, 1878–1879
 Annie Virginia Pollard, 1879-1913

Museum curators 
 Philip Lee Shane (1862-1943), until his retirement due to ill health at the end of the 19th century. 
 Susan Belle Shane (1858-1943), Philip's sister; curator until 1942

Publications 
"The Public Library of Kentucky and the Polytechnic Society of Kentucky," by Paul Allen Towne, first and only librarian of the Public Library of Kentucky, published serially in the Louisville Monthly magazine in 1879.

See also 
 Reuben T. Durrett
 Bennett H. Young
 The Filson Historical Society

References 

 Breyer, W. R., & Kinkade, E. L. (1944). Libraries and lotteries: a history of the Louisville free public library. Cynthiana, KY: Hobson Press.

Organizations based in Louisville, Kentucky
Defunct organizations based in Kentucky
1876 establishments in Kentucky
1913 disestablishments in Kentucky
Libraries in Louisville, Kentucky